Torstein Stenersen is a Swedish biathlete. He has competed in the Biathlon World Cup, and represented Sweden at the Biathlon World Championships 2016. 

He was born in Tromsø, Norway, on 16 October 1988.

References

1988 births
Living people
Sportspeople from Tromsø
Swedish male biathletes